Elena Wilma Lagorara (10 May 1939 – 16 November 2003) was an Italian gymnast. She competed in all artistic gymnastics events at the 1956 and 1960 Summer Olympics with the best individual result of 12th place on the vault in 1956. Her elder sister Luciana competed alongside her in 1956. Elena Wilma Lagorara died in 2003.

References

External links
 

1939 births
2003 deaths
Gymnasts at the 1956 Summer Olympics
Gymnasts at the 1960 Summer Olympics
Olympic gymnasts of Italy
Italian female artistic gymnasts